The Zahm Andrist is a mountain of the Bernese Alps, located south of Kiental in the Bernese Oberland. It lies west of the Hundshorn.

References

External links
 Zahm Andrist on Hikr

Mountains of the Alps
Mountains of Switzerland
Mountains of the canton of Bern
Two-thousanders of Switzerland